Deragh Campbell is a Canadian actress and filmmaker. She is known for her acclaimed performances in independent Canadian cinema. Her collaborations with filmmaker Sofia Bohdanowicz—Never Eat Alone (2016), Veslemøy's Song (2018), MS Slavic 7 (2019), and Point and Line to Plane (2020)—have screened at film festivals internationally. She has also featured in two of Kazik Radwanski's films, How Heavy This Hammer (2015) and Anne at 13,000 Ft. (2019), both of which premiered at the Toronto International Film Festival.

Campbell has won accolades for her work, including the Jay Scott Prize from the Toronto Film Critics Association and Best Actress in a Canadian Film from the Vancouver Film Critics Circle.

Career 
Originally from Toronto, Ontario, Campbell studied creative writing at Concordia University in Montreal, Quebec, before deciding to pursue an acting career.

Campbell made her film debut in Matthew Porterfield's 2013 independent feature film I Used to Be Darker. She was named as one of the Toronto International Film Festival's "Rising Stars" in 2015, alongside Stephan James, Aliocha Schneider, and Karelle Tremblay. Since then, she has appeared in several films, including How Heavy This Hammer (2015), The Other Half (2016), and Fail to Appear (2017).

Campbell's collaborations with filmmaker Sofia Bohdanowicz have screened at festivals around the world. Since 2016, she has portrayed the character of Audrey Benac in four Bohdanowicz films—Never Eat Alone (2016), Veslemøy's Song (2018), and MS Slavic 7 (2019), the latter of which Campbell co-directed as well. Never Eat Alone premiered in the Future//Present section of the 2016 Vancouver International Film Festival; Veslemøy's Song, a short film, premiered at the 2018 Locarno Film Festival and was named by the Toronto International Film Festival to its annual year-end Canada's Top Ten list; MS Slavic 7 had its world premiere at the 69th Berlin International Film Festival and screened at the annual New Directors/New Films Festival. Their latest short film, Point and Line to Plane, which also featured Campbell as the fictional character Audrey Benac, premiered at the Marseille International Film Festival in July 2020 and subsequently screened at the Toronto International Film Festival, the New York Film Festival, the Festival de nouveau cinéma in Montreal, and the Vienna International Film Festival, among others.

In 2019, Campbell starred in Brandon Cronenberg's short film Please Speak Continuously and Describe Your Experiences as They Come to You, which premiered at the 2019 Cannes Film Festival.

That same year, Campbell also starred in Kazik Radwanski's third feature film, Anne at 13,000 Ft., which premiered in the Platform Prize competition and received an honourable mention from the jury at the 2019 Toronto International Film Festival. Campbell earned rave reviews from critics for her performance in the film; the National Post called her "remarkable." Anne at 13,000 Ft. was also selected to screen at the 70th Berlin Film Festival, among other festivals.

Campbell starred opposite Michaela Kurimsky in Hannah Cheeseman's short film, Succor, which was an official selection for the 2020 Toronto International Film Festival.

Accolades 
Campbell is a three-time Vancouver Film Critics Circle award nominee for Best Actress in a Canadian Film, receiving nominations in 2016 for Never Eat Alone, in 2017 for Fail to Appear, and in 2019 for Anne at 13,000 Ft. She won the award in 2019 for Anne at 13,000 Ft.

In 2020, she was awarded the Jay Scott Prize by the Toronto Film Critics Association, and received a Canadian Screen Award nomination for Best Actress at the 8th Canadian Screen Awards for Anne at 13,000 Ft.

Filmography

References

External links

21st-century Canadian actresses
Canadian film actresses
Actresses from Toronto
Concordia University alumni
Living people
Year of birth missing (living people)